Whitehall High School is a public high school based in Whitehall Township in the Lehigh Valley region of eastern Pennsylvania. It is the only high school in the Whitehall-Coplay School District. As of the 2021-22 school year, the school had an enrollment of 1,499 students, according to National Center for Education Statistics data.

Whitehall High School is located at 3800 Mechanicsville Road in Whitehall Township. The school's mascot is the Zephyr, a train that used to travel through Whitehall Township, and the school's colors are maroon and vegas gold.

Whitehall's primary athletic rivals are Parkland High School in South Whitehall Township, Emmaus High School in Emmaus, and Northampton Area High School in Northampton.

Academics
In 2007, Whitehall High School earned second place in the Scholastic Scrimmage final.

Arts
Whitehall High School has won several Freddy Awards for their play and musical productions, including:

In 2022, Whitehall High School was presented "The Air Products Education/Community Impact Award" at the Freddy Awards for its production of Godspell.
In 2017, a Freddy Award for "Outstanding Performance by an Actress in a Supporting Role" for its production of Spamalot.
In 2016, a Freddy Award for "Outstanding Stage Crew" for its production of Guys and Dolls.
In 2015, Whitehall High School won two awards for their production of How to Succeed in Business Without Really Trying: "Outstanding Use of Scenery" and "Outstanding Stage Crew," both of which are the second consecutive year that Whitehall has won these awards.
In 2014, Whitehall High School won three Freddy Awards for its production of South Pacific, including "Outstanding Use of Scenery," "Outstanding Stage Crew," and "Outstanding Performance by an Actress in a Supporting Role".
In 2011, Whitehall High School won one Freddy Award for "Outstanding Overall Production of a Musical" for the production of Li'l Abner.
In 2007, Whitehall High School won five Freddy Awards, including "Best Overall Production," "Best Actor," "Best Solo Vocal Performance," "Best Costume Design," and "Best Small Ensemble Performance" for the production of The Scarlet Pimpernel.
In 2006, Whitehall High School won three Freddy Awards, including "Best Actor," "Best Featured Dancer," and "Best Costume Design" for the production of Barnum.

Athletics

Whitehall High School competes athletically in the Eastern Pennsylvania Conference (EPC) in the District XI division of the Pennsylvania Interscholastic Athletic Association, one of the premier high school athletic divisions in the nation.

Whitehall alumni in the NFL
Three notable Whitehall High School football players have gone on to successful careers in the National Football League: 

Saquon Barkley, current starting running back for the New York Giants, second overall selection in the 2018 NFL Draft, and 2018 Offensive Rookie of the Year;
Dan Koppen, former offensive center for the New England Patriots and Denver Broncos, who won two Super Bowls with the Patriots; and
Matt Millen, former defensive linebacker with the Oakland and Los Angeles Raiders, San Francisco 49ers, and Washington Redskins, who won two Super Bowls with the Oakland Raiders and one with the San Francisco 49ers. 
 
All three players' Whitehall jerseys (Barkley’s #21, Koppen's #77, and Millen's #83) have been permanently retired by the high school in honor of the their repective football accomplishments.

State and national championships

Whitehall has distinguished itself nationally and in the state of Pennsylvania with the following state and national championships:

Boys Basketball: 1982 (Pennsylvania state champions).
Cheerleading: 2001 (national champions).
Wrestling: 2001 and 2002 (Christian Franco, Pennsylvania state champion at 140 lb. weight class, 2002).
Indoor Percussion: 2003 Concert Percussion Champions; 2005, 2006, 2007 and 2008 World Class Champions.
Marching Zephyr Band: 2006 State and All-State Champions, 2007 State Champions. The Marching Zephyr Band has recently become 2017, 2018, 2019, and 2021 Cavalcade of Bands American Open Class Champions.

Conference championships

Whitehall has won many conference championships, including the following sports and years (Eastern Pennsylvania Conference since 2014, Lehigh Valley Conference 2002-2014, Mountain Valley Conference 1997-2002, East Penn Conference 1976-1997, Lehigh Valley League prior to 1976):

Baseball: 1966, 1972, 1974, 1977, 1979, 1980, 1984, 2004, 2005 and 2008.
Boys Basketball: 1979, 1981, 1982, 1983, 1985, 1989, 1992, 1993, 1994, 1996, 1997, 1998, 2000, 2004 and 2005.
Cheerleading: 1983, 1984, 1985, 1988, 1989, 1990, 1991, 1992 and 2001.
Football: 1976, 1978, 1980, 1981 (tri-champions with Dieruff High School and Emmaus High School), 1982, 1983, 1986, 1989, 1995, 1997, 1998 and 2005.
Girls Basketball: 1982, 1984, 1985, 1986, 1988, 1989 and 2000.
Girls Softball: 1979, 1988 and 1989.
Boys Volleyball: 2010.
Girls Soccer: 2011.

Whitehall holds the record for the most Lehigh Valley Conference championships in boys basketball.

Notable alumni
Saquon Barkley, professional football player, New York Giants, 2018 NFL Offensive Rookie of the Year
Brian Knobbs (Brian Yandrisovitz), professional wrestler
Dan Koppen, former professional football player, Denver Broncos and New England Patriots and two-time Super Bowl champion
Peter Lisicky, former professional basketball player, Lega Basket Serie A and EuroLeague
Matt Millen, former professional football player, Oakland Raiders, San Francisco 49ers and Washington Redskins, four-time Super Bowl champion, former president and general manarger of Detroit Lions, and current broadcaster, ESPN, NFL Network and Big Ten Network
Jerry Sags (Jerome Saganowich), professional wrestler
Dave Schneck, former professional baseball player, New York Mets 
Curt Simmons, former professional baseball player, California Angels, Chicago Cubs, Philadelphia Phillies, and St. Louis Cardinals, three-time All-Star, and 1964 World Series champion

References

External links
Official website
Whitehall High School athletics official website
Whitehall High School on Facebook
Whitehall High School on Twitter
Whitehall High School athletics on Twitter
Whitehall High School sports coverage at The Express-Times

Public high schools in Pennsylvania
Schools in Lehigh County, Pennsylvania